Castilla (sometimes incorrectly spelled Castilloa) is a genus of 3 species of large trees in the family Moraceae, native to Central and South America.

Etymology 
This genus is named after Juan Diego del Castillo (d. 1793), a Spanish botanist who was a friend of Vicente Cervantes, who chose the name in his friend's honor.

Description 
Castilla species are monoecious or dioecious trees up to 40 meters tall, with buttressed trunks and abundant white latex of commercial value. The branchlets have scars left by the fallen stipules. The leaves are oblong to elliptic, with entire margins. The inflorescences are surrounded by bracts and have small flowers. The male flowers are borne in lengthwise-folded kidney-shaped inflorescences and female flowers in globose inflorescences. The infrutescence varies in shape and has orange or red fruits.

Ecology 

Castilla species exhibit a phenomenon known as cladoptosis, the regular shedding of branches. This may be an adaptation to prevent the growth of climbing plants.

Castilla elastica is a weedy tree which has become invasive in areas where it has been introduced, such as in Tanzania and the South Pacific.

Uses 
The main species is Castilla elastica, one of several plants from which rubber has been extracted. The vernacular name is Panama rubber tree or castilloa rubber.  The pre-Columbian MesoAmericans used the latex of this plant to make a ball used in a ceremonial game.

The Miskitu and Mayangna peoples of the Mosquito Coast, stretching from the Honduras to Nicaragua, traditionally made fabric from the bark of the Tunu rubber tree (Castilla tunu).

Species

See also
 Rubber

References

Moraceae
Moraceae genera
Fiber plants